RalBP1-associated Eps domain-containing protein 2 is a protein that in humans is encoded by the REPS2 gene.

Function 

The product of this gene is part of a protein complex that regulates the endocytosis of growth factor receptors. The encoded protein directly interacts with a GTPase activating protein that functions downstream of the small G protein Ral. Its expression can negatively affect receptor internalization and inhibit growth factor signaling. Multiple transcript variants encoding different isoforms have been found for this gene.

Interactions 
REPS2 has been shown to interact with EPN1, EPS15 and RALBP1.

References

Further reading 

 
 
 
 
 
 
 
 
 

EH-domain-containing proteins